Ghia is a surname, used in both Italy and India. Notable people with the name include:
Ami Ghia (born 1952), Indian badminton player
Dana Ghia (born 1932), Italian actress, singer, and model
Fernando Ghia (1935–2005), Italian film producer and talent agent
Giacinto Ghia (1887–1944), Italian automobile coachbuilder
Kantilal Ghia, Indian politician
Urmila Ghia, Indian-American mechanical engineer

See also
Carrozzeria Ghia, automotive company founded by Giacinto Ghia
Ghia Mtayrek (born 2000), Lebanese footballer
Ghia Nodia (born 1954), Georgian political analyst
Ghia River, in Romania